Cyanopepla chelidon is a moth of the subfamily Arctiinae. It was described by Herbert Druce in 1893. It is found in Colombia and the Upper Amazon region.

References

Cyanopepla
Moths described in 1893